This is a list of women artists who were born in Finland or whose artworks are closely associated with that country.

A
Eva Acke (1855–1929), painter
Nina Ahlstedt (1853–1907), painter
Eija-Liisa Ahtila (born 1959), photographer, video artist
Miina Äkkijyrkkä (born 1949), painter, sculptor
Helena Arnell (1697–1751), painter

B
Heidi Blomstedt (1911–1982), ceramist
Elina Brotherus (born 1972), photographer and video artist
Rut Bryk (1916–1999), ceramist

C
Margareta Capsia (1682–1759), painter
Fanny Churberg (1845–1892), landscape painter

D
Elin Danielson-Gambogi (1861–1919), painter

E
Anna Eriksson (born 1977), filmmaker

F
Ellen Favorin (1853–1919), painter
Hilda Flodin (1877–1958), sculptor, etcher and painter
Alina Forsman (1845–1899), sculptor
Alexandra Frosterus-Såltin (1837–1916), painter, illustrator

G
Viola Gråsten (1910–1994), textile designer

H
Greta Hällfors-Sipilä (1899–1974), painter
Nanna Hänninen (born 1973), photographic artist
Ilona Harima (1911–1986), painter
Helena Hietanen (born 1963), textile artist
Eila Hiltunen (1922–2003), sculptor
Sasha Huber (born 1975), contemporary artist

J
Tove Jansson (1914–2001), painter, illustrator, cartoonist

K
Meeri Koutaniemi (born 1987), photographer and journalist
Sinikka Kurkinen (born 1935), painter

L
Gun Lanciai (1920–2013), sculptor
Kaisa Leka (born 1978), cartoonist, politician
Rakel Liekki (born 1979), filmmaker, journalist and writer
Marita Liulia (born 1957), media artist
Sirkka-Liisa Lonka (born 1943), painter, graphic artist
Amélie Lundahl (1850–1914), painter
Leena Luostarinen (1949–2013), painter
Kiba Lumberg (born 1956), artist, writer

M
Tea Mäkipää (born 1973), contemporary artist
Charlotta Malm-Reuterholm (1768–1845), painter, writer
Totte Mannes (born 1933), painter
Marjatta Metsovaara (1927–2014), textile artist
Marja Mikkonen (born 1979), filmmaker
Helvi Mustonen (born 1947), painter

N
Elena Näsänen (born 1968), visual artist working with film and video installations
Elin Alfhild Nordlund (1861–1941), painter
Gunnel Nyman (1909–1948), glass and metal artist

P
Outi Pieski (born 1973), Sámi visual artist
Tuulikki Pietilä (1917–2009), graphic artist
Ulla Procopé (1921–1968), ceramist
Laila Pullinen (1933–2015), artist, sculptor

R
Essi Renvall (1911–1979), sculptor
Diana Ringo (born 1992), filmmaker, visual artist
Nastja Säde Rönkkö (born 1985), performance artist
Hanna Rönnberg (1862–1946), painter and writer
Mathilda Rotkirch (1813–1842), painter
Johanna Rytkölä (born 1956), sculptor, ceramic artist

S
Nina Sailo (1906–1998), sculptor
Sigrid Schauman (1877–1979), artist, art critic
Helene Schjerfbeck (1862–1946), painter
Ida Silfverberg (1834–1899), painter
Helmi Sjöstrand (1864–1957), painter
Anita Snellman (1924–2006), painter 
Venny Soldan-Brofeldt (1863–1945), painter, illustrator, graphic artist and jewellery designer
Minna Sundberg (born 1990), illustrator, cartoonist

T
Marjatta Tapiola (born 1951), painter
Sophie Taxell (1911–1996), painter
Ellen Thesleff (1869–1954), expressionist painter
Hilkka Toivola (1909–2002), stained-glass artist
Salla Tykkä (born 1973), video artist
Katja Tukiainen (born 1969), painter, comics artist

V
Marja Vallila (born 1950), sculptor
Sonja Vectomov (born 1957), sculptor

W
Dora Wahlroos (1870–1947), painter
Martta Wendelin (1893–1986), painter
Helena Westermarck (1857–1938), painter, writer
Maria Wiik (1853–1928), painter
Maria Wolfram (born 1961), painter and installation artist

Z
Margaretha Zetterberg (1773–1803), textile and crafts artist

-
Finnish women artists, List of
Artists
Artists